Asylum Run is a  tributary of Paxton Creek in Dauphin County, Pennsylvania in the United States.

Asylum Run joins Paxton Creek at the north-easternmost border of Harrisburg at the Pennsylvania Farm Show Complex.

It is a tributary with flashy flows, meaning the water levels can vary greatly with storm events, due to rapid runoff upstream from massive amounts of impervious surfaces in Colonial Park, Penbrook, and adjacent areas.

See also
List of rivers of Pennsylvania

References

Rivers of Pennsylvania
Tributaries of the Susquehanna River
Rivers of Dauphin County, Pennsylvania